Maleimide is a chemical compound with the formula H2C2(CO)2NH (see diagram). This unsaturated imide is an important building block in organic synthesis. The name is a contraction of maleic acid and imide, the -C(O)NHC(O)- functional group.  Maleimides also describes a class of derivatives of the parent maleimide where the NH group is replaced with alkyl or aryl groups such as a methyl or phenyl, respectively. The substituent can also be a small molecule (such as biotin, a fluorescent dye, an oligosaccharide, or a nucleic acid), a reactive group, or a synthetic polymer such as polyethylene glycol. Human hemoglobin chemically modified with maleimide-polyethylene glycol is a blood substitute called MP4.

Organic chemistry
Maleimide and its derivatives are prepared from maleic anhydride by treatment with amines followed by dehydration. A special feature of the reactivity of maleimides is their susceptibility to additions across the double bond either by Michael additions or via Diels-Alder reactions. Bismaleimides are a class of compounds with two maleimide groups connected by the nitrogen atoms via a linker, and are used as crosslinking reagents in thermoset polymer chemistry. Compounds containing a maleimide group linked with another reactive group, such as an activated N-hydroxysuccinimide ester, are called maleimide heterobifunctional reagents (for example, see SMCC reagent).

Natural maleimides
Only a handful of natural maleimides –  exemplified by the cytotoxic showdomycin from Streptomyces showdoensis, and pencolide from Pe. multicolor – have been reported. Farinomalein was first isolated in 2009 from the entomopathogenic fungus Isaria farinosa (Paecilomyces farinosus) – source H599 (Japan).

Biotechnology and pharmaceutical applications
Maleimide-mediated methodologies are among the most used in bioconjugation. Due to exceptionally fast reaction rates and significantly high selectivity towards cysteine residues in proteins, a large variety of maleimide heterobifunctional reagents are used for the preparation of targeted therapeutics, assemblies for studying proteins in their biological context, protein-based microarrays, or proteins immobilisation.
For instance, emerging promising targeted drug therapies, antibody-drug conjugates, are constituted of three main components: a monoclonal antibody, a cytotoxic drug, and a linker molecule often containing a maleimide group, which binds the drug and the antibody.

Maleimides linked to polyethylene glycol chains are often used as flexible linking molecules to attach proteins to surfaces. The double bond readily reacts with the thiol group found on cysteine to form a stable carbon-sulfur bond. Attaching the other end of the polyethylene chain to a bead or solid support allows for easy separation of protein from other molecules in solution, provided these molecules do not also possess thiol groups.

Maleimide-functionalised polymers and liposomes exhibit enhanced ability to adhere to mucosal surfaces (mucoadhesion) due to the reactions with thiol-containing mucins. This could be applicable in the design of dosage forms for transmucosal drug delivery.

Technological applications
Maleimides linked to rubber chains are often used as flexible linking molecules to reinforce rubber in tires. The double bond readily reacts with all hydroxy, amine or thiol groups found on the matrix to form a stable carbon-oxygen, carbon-nitrogen, or carbon-sulfur bond, respectively. These polymers are used in aerospace for high temperature applications of composites. Lockheed Martin's F-22 extensively uses thermoset composites, with bismaleimide and toughened epoxy comprising up to 17.5% and 6.6% of the structure by weight respectively. Lockheed Martin's F-35B (a STOVL version of this US fighter) is reportedly composed of bismaleimide materials, in addition to the use of advanced carbon fiber thermoset polymer matrix composites.

See also
 N-Methylmaleimide
 Succinimide

References

External links
 The MP4 website, Molecule of the Month, December 2004